Spondylurus sloanii, also known commonly as Sloane's skink or the Virgin Islands bronze skink, is a species of lizard in the family Scincidae. The species is native to the United States Virgin Islands and the British Virgin Islands.

Etymology
The specific name, sloanii, is in honor of British naturalist Hans Sloane.

Habitat
The preferred natural habitats of S. sloanii are the intertidal zone and shrubland.

Reproduction
S. sloanii is viviparous.

References

Further reading
Daudin FM (1802). Histoire Naturelle, Générale et Particulière des Reptiles; Ouvrage faisant suite à l'Histoire Naturelle générale et particulière, composée par Leclerc de Buffon; et rédigée par C.S.Sonnini, membre de plusieurs sociétés savantes. Tome quatrième [Volume 4]. Paris: F. Dufart. 397 pp. (Scincus sloanii, new species, pp. 287–290). (in French and Latin).
Hedges SB, Conn CE (2012). "A new skink fauna from Caribbean Islands (Squamata, Mabuyidae, Mabuyinae)". Zootaxa 3288: 1–244. (Spondylurus sloanii, pp. 201–207).

Spondylurus
Reptiles described in 1803
Reptiles of the Caribbean

Endemic fauna of the Caribbean
Taxa named by François Marie Daudin